Siebold's water snake (Ferania sieboldii), also known commonly as Siebold's mud snake and Siebold's smooth water snake, is a species of mildly venomous, rear-fanged snake in the family Homalopsidae. The species is endemic to Asia.

Etymology
Both the specific name, sieboldii, and the common name, Siebold's water snake, are in honor of Philipp Franz von Siebold, a German botanist and physician.

Geographic range
F. sieboldii is found in Bangladesh, northcentral India, and western Malaysia.

Habitat
The preferred natural habitat of F. sieboldii is freshwater wetlands.

Description
F. sieboldii has a dorsal pattern of large blotches similar to those of a python, but it is distinctive in having its nostrils on the top of the snout to aid its aquatic lifestyle. It also lacks labial pits. 

Reproduction
F. sieboldii is viviparous.

References

Further reading
Boulenger GA (1890). The Fauna of British India, Including Ceylon and Burma. Reptilia and Batrachia. London: Secretary of State for India in Council. (Taylor and Francis, printers). xviii + 541 pp. (Hypsirhina sieboldii, pp. 377–378).
Boulenger GA (1896). Catalogue of the Snakes in the British Museum (Natural History). Volume III., Containing the Colubridæ (Opisthoglyphæ and Proteroglyphæ), ... London: Trustees of the British Museum (Natural History). (Taylor and Francis, printers). xiv + 727 pp. + Plates I-XXV. (Hypsirhina sieboldii, pp. 11–12).
Duméril A-M-C, Bibron G, Duméril A[-H-A] (1854). Erpétologie générale ou histoire naturelle complète des reptiles. Tome septième. Deuxième partie. Comprenant l'histoire des serpents venimeux. Paris: Roret. xii + pp. 781–1536. (Trigonurus sieboldii, pp. 960–964). (in French).
Günther A (1864). The Reptiles of British India. London: The Ray Society. (Taylor and Francis, printers). xxvii + 452 pp. + Plates I-XXVI. (Ferania sieboldii, p. 284).
Kumar AB, Sanders KL, George S, Murphy JC (2012). "The status of Eurostus dussumierii and Hypsirhina chinensis (Reptilia, Squamata, Serpentes): with comments on the origin of salt tolerance in homalopsid snakes". Systematics and Biodiversity 10 (4): 479–489. (Ferania sieboldii ).
Smith MA (1943). The Fauna of British India, Ceylon and Burma, Including the Whole of the Indo-Chinese Sub-region. Reptilia and Amphibia. Vol. III.—Serpentes. London: Secretary of State for India. (Taylor and Francis, printers). xii + 583 pp. (Enhydris sieboldi, pp. 389–390).
Wall F (1908). "Notes on a gravid female of Siebold's watersnake (Hypsirhina sieboldii)". Journal of the Bombay Natural History Society 18: 920.

Monotypic snake genera
Reptiles described in 1837